Vladislav Dmitriyevich Oslonovsky (born 15 January 1995) is a Russian football midfielder.

Club career
He started playing in the youth teams of Portuguese club Benfica and Russian Spartak Moscow.

He made his debut in the Russian Second Division for Volga Ulyanovsk on 21 April 2013 in a game against Oktan Perm.

He made his Russian Football National League debut for FC Shinnik Yaroslavl on 11 July 2016 in a game against FC Baltika Kaliningrad.

References

External links
 
 

1995 births
Living people
Sportspeople from Omsk
Russian footballers
Russia youth international footballers
Association football midfielders
Russian expatriate footballers
NK Istra 1961 players
Expatriate footballers in Croatia
FK Teteks players
Expatriate footballers in North Macedonia
FC Dynamo Saint Petersburg players
FC Shinnik Yaroslavl players
FC Ararat-Armenia players
FC Tyumen players
Expatriate footballers in Armenia
FC Chayka Peschanokopskoye players
FC Nosta Novotroitsk players
FC Volga Ulyanovsk players